Paco de Lucía interpreta a Manuel de Falla is the twelfth studio album by the Spanish composer and guitarist Paco de Lucía. All the pieces were written by Manuel de Falla.

De Falla was a composer who wrote very little music for the guitar. Although there is no doubt that de Falla was influenced by cante jondo, his music has to be arranged for guitar. In this respect, he can be compared to another Spanish composer, Isaac Albéniz whose piano music has entered the guitar repertory.

The three dances from The Three-Cornered Hat (1911) were originally written for orchestra.  They take the form of seguidillas ("Danza de los Vecinos") and farrucas (the dances of the miller and his wife).

El Amor Brujo was written to feature a flamenco dancer plus actors and musicians. It was originally scored for a small band and a singer, a vocal part intended for a cantaora.

Track listing
"Danza de los Vecinos" from The Three-Cornered Hat (El Sombrero de Tres Picos) – 3:09
"Danza ritual del fuego" (from El Amor Brujo) – 4:24
"Introducción y pantomima" (from El Amor Brujo) – 2:59
"El Paño Moruno" (from Siete Canciones Populares) – 1:27
"Danza del Molinero" (from El Sombrero de Tres Picos) – 3:04
"Danza" (from La Vida Breve) – 3:24
"Escena" (from El Amor Brujo) – 1:25
"Canción del fuego fatuo" (from El Amor Brujo) – 4:05
"Danza del terror" (from El Amor Brujo) – 1:48
"Danza de la Molinera" (from El Sombrero de Tres Picos) – 4:01

Musicians
Paco de Lucía - Flamenco guitar
Ramón de Algeciras - Flamenco Guitar                                                                                                                         
Pepe de Lucía - Vocal                                                                                                                                      
Alvaro Yebenes - Bass guitar                                                                                                                          
Rubem Dantas - Percussion                                                                                                                                 
Jorge Pardo - Flute
Pedro Ruy-Blas - Drums

References

 Gamboa, Manuel José and Nuñez, Faustino. (2003). Paco de Lucía. Madrid:Universal Music Spain.

1978 albums
1970s classical albums
Paco de Lucía albums